Foundation For Children (FFC) is a non-profit and non-governmental organization helping children in Thailand. It was founded in 1978 and based in Bangkok.

In 2006, the Foundation For Children, with support of the Herbalife Family Foundation (HFF), established a Casa Herbalife program serving homeless and underprivileged children in Bangkok.

Official objectives
 To provide opportunities for underprivileged and homeless children to fully develop their physical, intellectual and creative potentials
 To seek healthy alternatives in education and child-rearing in which the dignity of children is upheld and their opinions considered
 To assist and cooperate with the individuals and organizations working for children's education and welfare
 To bridge the differences between children and older generations, so those children may be recognized and treated as worthy and equal members of society
 To protect children who are abused and neglected, and to restore their family relationships
 To campaign for public awareness on children's rights

Projects
 Nutrition help for malnourished children.
 Defence of children rights, through the work of the Center for the Protection of Children's Rights
 Preventing child prostitution, by the Center for the Protection of Children's Rights
 Alternative education, the Children's Village School (Moo Baan Dek)
 Creative media for children, through the FFC Publishing House
 Promotion of family roles in the prevention of child abuse

References

1978 establishments in Thailand
Children's charities based in Thailand
Organizations based in Bangkok
Organizations established in 1978